Events in the year 1841 in Uruguay.

Incumbents

Executive branch 
 President: Fructuoso Rivera.
 Minister of Government and Foreign Relations: Francisco Antonino Vidal Gosende.
 Minister of Finance: Alejandro Chucarro, later José de Béjar.
 Minister of War and Navy: Enrique Santiago del Carmen.

Legislative branch 
 President of the Senate: Joaquín Suárez.
 President of the Chamber of Deputies: Julián Álvarez.

Events 
 11 February – Uruguayan Civil War: The right of prize was decreed as a "good prize" to seize every Argentine ship with credentials of the Governor of Buenos Aires along with its cargo, that were navigating in Uruguay, Paraná and de la Plata rivers, and later those from high seas, except for ships coming from Corrientes province.
 27 November – The execution of a national census was ordered.

Births 
 9 January - Julio Herrera y Obes, Uruguayan politician, lawyer and journalist, also President of Uruguay in the 1890-1894 term (d. 1912).
 3 February - Conrado Villegas, Argentine military officer born in Uruguay (d. 1884).
 4 February - Jacobo Varela, Uruguayan educator and politician, also served as Minister of Finance in 1889-1890 (d. 1900).

Deaths 
 11 August: Jacinto Ventura de Molina, writer (b. 1766).
 29 September: Adolfo Berro, Uruguayan poet (b. 1819).

References